The 2002 Estonian Figure Skating Championships were held in Tallinn from December 7 to 9, 2001. Skaters competed in the disciplines of men's singles, ladies' singles, pair skating, ice dancing, and synchronized skating.

Senior results

Men

Ladies

Pairs

Ice dancing

Synchronized

Junior results
The 2002 Estonian Junior Figure Skating Championships took place in Tallinn from February 8 through 10, 2002.

Men

Ladies
12 participants

Ice dancing

References

Figure Skating Championships
Estonian Figure Skating Championships, 2002
Estonian Figure Skating Championships